Doris Petrie (24 July 1918 – 21 August 2000) was a Canadian film and television actress, best known for her roles in the William Fruet films Wedding in White (1972) and Funeral Home (1980); and also the television series High Hopes, in which she played Meg Chapman.

She also had guest appearances in the television series Seeing Things, Airwaves, Night Heat, The Littlest Hobo, The Starlost, Street Legal, Forever Knight, TekWar: TekLords and Road to Avonlea, and the television films Catsplay, The Olden Days Coat and Love and Hate: The Story of Colin and JoAnn Thatcher.

Petrie was born in Londonderry, Nova Scotia. She died on August 21, 2000 in Toronto. She was the mother of television journalist Anne Petrie.

References

External links

1918 births
2000 deaths
Actresses from Nova Scotia
Canadian film actresses
Canadian television actresses
People from Colchester County
Canadian stage actresses
Dora Mavor Moore Award winners
20th-century Canadian actresses
Best Supporting Actress Genie and Canadian Screen Award winners